Knife Man is the fourth full-length studio release by Andrew Jackson Jihad released by Asian Man Records on September 20, 2011. The album was recorded and mixed by Jalipaz Nelson at Audioconfusion in Mesa, Arizona.

Track listing

Critical reception

Punk music review site AbsolutePunk gave the album a rating of 86 out of 100 with Dre Okorley concluding that "Knife Man is synonymous to the gritted teeth and theatrical story lining of a clever manic depressive duo on a wild ride of political blindsiding and folk-rock maturity." Pop Matters gave the album a score of 8/10 stating "The moralizing on Knife Man does get heavy-handed at times, but the homespun simplicity and rage with which it’s delivered actually adds to its power." Also stating it was "one of the most remarkable albums you'll hear all year." Sputnikmusic gave the album 4.5/5.

Personnel

Andrew Jackson Jihad
Sean Bonnette - lead vocals, rhythm guitar, kazoo
Ben Gallaty - bass guitar, double bass, guitar, backing vocals, percussion, bells, sampler
Preston Bryant - drums on "Distance" and "No One", organ on "No One", lead guitar and piano on "Sad Songs (Intermission)"
Deacon Batchelor - drums, percussion, backing vocals
Dylan Cook - mandolin, backing vocals

Additional Personnel
Stephen Steinbrink - electric guitar, bells, and organ on "Back Pack"
Ben Horowitz - guitar on "Hate, Rain on Me"
John Martin - organ on "If You Have Love In Your Heart"
Shane Kennedy - drums on "American Tune", "Sad Songs (Intermission), and "Free Bird", co-producer
Alex Cardwell - backing vocals
Beth Lasswell - backing vocals
Colin Levy - backing vocals
JoJo "Sninja" Martín - backing vocals
Carl Saff - mastering
Jalipaz Nelson - recording, mixing
Stephanie Carrico – photography
Sentrock - artwork
Jeff Rosenstock - layout

References

2011 albums
Asian Man Records albums
AJJ (band) albums